A list of films produced by the Turkish film industry in Turkey in 2011.

Highest-grossing films

Events
January
21 — Haydar Demirtaş's My Father Is Making History receives Best Documentary Audience Award from 15th Boston Turkish Culture and Art Festival.
30 — Seren Yüce's Majority shares Grand Jury Prize at 23rd Premiers Plans European First Film Festival in Angers, France.
February
11 — 61st Berlin International Film Festival holds gala in collaboration with 30th International Istanbul Film Festival to promote Turkish cinema.
16 — 10th !f Istanbul AFM International Independent Film Festival opens with gala screening of Benedek Fliegauf's Womb.
16 — Seyfi Teoman's Our Grand Despair premiers in competition at 61st Berlin International Film Festival.
17 — Semih Kaplanoğlu honored at 4th Crystal Clapperboard Short Film Competition.
19 — Hamo Beknazarian's Zare (1926) screens at 10th !f Istanbul AFM International Independent Film Festival accompanied by Kurdish harpist Tara Jaff.
24 — 43rd SİYAD Awards presented at the Türker İnanoğlu Maslak Show Center in Istanbul.
March
6 — Derviş Zaim's Shadows and Faces gets special green line showing in the divided Cypriot capital.
9 — 8th Paris Turkish Film Festival opens with screening of Reha Erdem's Cosmos.
12 — 9th Filmmor Women's Film Festival on Wheels opens in Istanbul.
12 — Selim Güneş's White as Snow wins Special Jury Award at Sofia Film Festival.
15 — Beirut Turkish Film Festival opens with gala at Metropolis Empire Sofil Movie Theater.
16 — 22nd Ankara International Film Festival opens with gala at Ministry of Education Assembly Hall.
17 — 16th Nuremberg Turkish-German Film Festival honors Fatih Akın at opening gala.
17 — Awards presented at conclusion of 7th Akbank Short Film Festival at Akbank Art Center in Taksim, Istanbul.
20 — 3rd Golden Okra Awards presented on final day of 9th Filmmor Women's Film Festival on Wheels in Istanbul.
21  — 4th Yeşilçam Week starts in Istanbul's Beyoğlu district.
24  — 10th Boston Turkish Film Festival opens with gala screening of Zeki Demirkubuz's Envy.
25  — Derviş Zaim receives Award for Excellence in Turkish Cinema at 10th Boston Turkish Film Festival.
27 — Derviş Zaim's Shadows and Faces wins Best Film at 22nd Ankara International Film Festival.
28 — 4th Yeşilçam Awards presented at the Lütfi Kırdar Congress & Exhibition Hall in Istanbul at conclusion of 4th Yeşilçam Week.
April
1 — 30th International Istanbul Film Festival opens with a gala ceremony at the Lütfi Kırdar Congress and Exhibition Hall.
5 — Restored copy of Memduh Ün's 1958 melodrama Three Friends screens at special gala at Atlas Theater in Beyoğlu, Istanbul.
9 — 22nd Turkish Film Days in Munich opens with Yasemin Şamdereli's Almanya: Welcome to Germany to mark the 50th anniversary of the guest worker agreement.
10 — 3rd Turkish Films Week in Bosnia-Herzegovina opens with Nuri Bilge Ceylan's Three Monkeys (Turkish: Üç Maymun).
11 — Tindersticks start Claire Denis Film Scores 1995-2010 international tour at 30th International Istanbul Film Festival.
12 — Nuri Bilge Ceylan presented with French Order of Arts and Letters.
13 — 2nd Hong Kong Turkish Films Festival opens at Elements shopping mall.
13 — 2nd Ankara Mountain Film Festival opens at Çankaya Municipality Contemporary Arts Center.
13 — 30th International Istanbul Film Festival Labor Awards presented
15 — 3rd Turkish Film Week in Pristine, Kosovo opens with Uğur Yücel's Dragon Trap (Ejder Kapanı).
16 — 30th International Istanbul Film Festival closes with awards for Seyfi Teoman's Our Grand Despair (Bizim Büyük Çaresizliğimiz) and Tayfun Pirselimoğlu's Hair (Saç).

Released films

January to June

July to December

See also
2011 in Turkey

References

2011
Turkey
Films
2011 in Turkish cinema